Calopteryx haemorrhoidalis is a species of damselfly in the family Calopterygidae known by the common names copper demoiselle and Mediterranean demoiselle.

Subspecies
Subspecies include:
  Calopteryx haemorrhoidalis haemorrhoidalis (Vander Linden, 1825)
  Calopteryx haemorrhoidalis occasi Capra, 1945
  Calopteryx haemorrhoidalis asturica Ocharan, 1983
  Calopteryx haemorrhoidalis almogravensis Hartung, 1996

Distribution
This species is native to the western Mediterranean Basin in Europe (Iberia, southern France, Italy, Monaco) and North Africa (Algeria, Morocco, Tunisia). It is common in much of its range.

Habitat
It lives along rivers and streams, but also in sunny larger waters. Though it may be affected by habitat changes such as water pollution.

Description

The males have a dark, metallic shining body, the color of which can be red-violet, golden or copper-colored. On the underside of the last three abdominal segments there red area, the so-called "red lantern" (hence the Latin species name haemorrhoidalis, meaning "blood flow"). The wings of males show a large dark area, while the females have a brown band to the wing tip and a metallic-green to bronze-colored body, with a brown belt on the back.

Biology
The flight time of this species ranges from May to September. The males have a characteristic mating dance, showing the abdomen end and spreading their wings wide. The male of this species is territorial, defending sites where females may choose to lay eggs.

This species can hybridize with Calopteryx splendens.

Gallery

Bibliography
 B. Misof, C.L. Anderson, H. Hadrys A phylogeny of the damselfly genus Calopteryx (Odonata) using mitochondrial 16S rDNA markers. in: Molecular Phylogenetics and Evolution. Academic Press, Orlando Fla. 15.2000, 1, 5–14. ISSN 1095-9513
 K.-D. B. Dijkstra, illustrations: R. Lewington, Guide des libellules de France et d'Europe, Delachaux et Niestlé, Paris, 2007, . 
 Van Der Linden, 1825 : Monographiae Libellullinarum Europaearum Specimen.

References

External links

 Linnea 

Calopterygidae
Damselflies of Europe
Odonata of Africa
Odonata of North America
Insects of the United States
Insects described in 1825